The Convention on Long-Range Transboundary Air Pollution, often abbreviated as Air Convention or CLRTAP, is intended to protect the human environment against air pollution and to gradually reduce and prevent air pollution, including long-range transboundary air pollution. It is implemented by the European Monitoring and Evaluation Programme (EMEP), directed by the United Nations Economic Commission for Europe (UNECE).

Secretariat 
The Convention, which now has 51 Parties, identifies the Executive Secretary of the United Nations Economic Commission for Europe (UNECE) as its secretariat. The current parties to the Convention are shown on the map.

The Convention is implemented by the European Monitoring and Evaluation Programme (EMEP) (short for Co-operative Programme for Monitoring and Evaluation of the Long-range Transmission of Air Pollutants in Europe). Results of the EMEP programme are published on the EMEP website, www.emep.int.

Procedure 
The aim of the Convention is that Parties shall endeavour to limit and, as far as possible, gradually reduce and prevent air pollution including long-range transboundary air pollution. Parties develop policies and strategies to combat the discharge of air pollutants through exchanges of information, consultation, research and monitoring.

The Parties meet annually at sessions of the Executive Body to review ongoing work and plan future activities including a workplan for the coming year. The three main subsidiary bodies – the Working Group on Effects, the Steering Body to EMEP and the Working Group on Strategies and Review – as well as the Convention's Implementation Committee, report to the Executive Body each year.

Currently, the Convention's priority activities include review and possible revision of its most recent protocols, implementation of the Convention and its protocols across the entire UNECE region (with special focus on Eastern Europe, the Caucasus and Central Asia and South-East Europe) and sharing its knowledge and information with other regions of the world.

Protocols 
Since 1979 the Convention on Long-range Transboundary Air Pollution has addressed some of the major environmental problems of the UNECE region through scientific collaboration and policy negotiation. The Convention has been extended by eight protocols that identify specific measures to be taken by Parties to cut their emissions of air pollutants:

 Protocol on Long-Term Financing of the Cooperative Programme for Monitoring and Evaluation of the Long-range Transmission of Air Pollutants in Europe (EMEP) (1984)
 1985 Helsinki Protocol on the Reduction of Sulphur Emissions
 Nitrogen Oxide Protocol (1988)
 Volatile Organic Compounds Protocol (1991)
 1994 Oslo Protocol on Further Reduction of Sulphur Emissions
 Protocol on Heavy Metals (1998)
 Aarhus Protocol on Persistent Organic Pollutants (1998)
 1999 Gothenburg Protocol to Abate Acidification, Eutrophication and Ground-level Ozone (1999)

See also 
 Aarhus Protocol on Persistent Organic Pollutants
 Protocol on Heavy Metals
 Critical load
International environmental agreements
 Gothenburg (Multi-effect) Protocol
1985 Helsinki Protocol on the Reduction of Sulphur Emissions
1994 Oslo Protocol on Further Reduction of Sulphur Emissions
Volatile Organic Compounds Protocol
 CIA World Factbook,  edition

References

External links 
 Convention on Long-Range Transboundary Air Pollution
Ratifications, at depositary

 
Climate change treaties
Environmental treaties
Treaties concluded in 1979
Treaties entered into force in 1983
Air pollution
1983 in the environment
Treaties of Albania
Treaties of Armenia
Treaties of Austria
Treaties of Azerbaijan
Treaties of the Byelorussian Soviet Socialist Republic
Treaties of Belgium
Treaties of Bosnia and Herzegovina
Treaties of the People's Republic of Bulgaria
Treaties of Canada
Treaties of Croatia
Treaties of Cyprus
Treaties of the Czech Republic
Treaties of Czechoslovakia
Treaties of Denmark
Treaties of Estonia
Treaties entered into by the European Union
Treaties of Finland
Treaties of France
Treaties of Georgia (country)
Treaties of West Germany
Treaties of East Germany
Treaties of Greece
Treaties of the Hungarian People's Republic
Treaties of Iceland
Treaties of Ireland
Treaties of Italy
Treaties of Kazakhstan
Treaties of Kyrgyzstan
Treaties of Latvia
Treaties of Liechtenstein
Treaties of Lithuania
Treaties of Luxembourg
Treaties of Malta
Treaties of Monaco
Treaties of Montenegro
Treaties of the Netherlands
Treaties of Norway
Treaties of the Polish People's Republic
Treaties of Portugal
Treaties of Moldova
Treaties of Romania
Treaties of the Soviet Union
Treaties of Serbia and Montenegro
Treaties of Slovakia
Treaties of Slovenia
Treaties of Spain
Treaties of Sweden
Treaties of Switzerland
Treaties of North Macedonia
Treaties of Turkey
Treaties of the Ukrainian Soviet Socialist Republic
Treaties of the United Kingdom
Treaties of the United States
United Nations Economic Commission for Europe treaties
Treaties extended to Jersey
Treaties extended to Guernsey
Treaties extended to the Isle of Man
Treaties extended to Gibraltar
Treaties extended to Akrotiri and Dhekelia
Treaties extended to the Faroe Islands
Treaties extended to Greenland
Treaties extended to West Berlin